I'm Telling You for the Last Time is a 1998 stand-up comedy special and the second starring Jerry Seinfeld. The special aired live on HBO on August 9, 1998, from the Broadhurst Theatre in New York City. It was then released as an album on cassette and CD by the same title that same year. In 1999, a VHS and DVD titled Jerry Seinfeld: I'm Telling You for the Last Time - Live on Broadway was released.

The recording was taped just a couple of months after the show Seinfeld went off the air. Entertainment Weekly said about the album: "On its own, the CD is a more than respectable stand-up disc; Seinfeld's riffs ... are worthy of preservation." I'm Telling You for the Last Time was nominated for a 1999 Grammy Award for Best Spoken Comedy Album. After recording this special/album, Seinfeld vowed never to use old material again referencing his repeated use of "bits" from Seinfeld.

Album

Track listing
"Intro/Phones"
"Cab Drivers"
"Air Travel"
"Florida"
"Halloween"
"Supermarkets"
"Drugstores"
"Doctors"
"Men and Women"
"Chinese People"
"McDonalds"
"Olympics"
"Scuba Diving"
"No. 1 Fear"
"Sky Diving/The Helmet"
"Clothing"
"Late TV"
"Crooks"
"Horses"
"Bathroom"
"Q+A"

Production
At the beginning of the special, there is a pre-taped bit of a funeral where Jerry is burying his old material. Mourners include fellow comedians, 
George Carlin, Robert Klein, Garry Shandling, Ed McMahon, Paul Reiser, Jay Leno, George Wallace, Larry Miller, and Alan King.

In addition to the physical formats, the audio album can be streamed on Spotify.

Awards
In 1999, the special was nominated for 2 Primetime Emmy Awards in Outstanding Variety, Music or Comedy Special and Outstanding Technical Direction/Camera/Video for a Special.

The American Comedy Awards nominated Jerry for the Funniest Male Performer in a TV Special and the Directors Guild of America Awards nominated Marty Callner for Outstanding Directorial Achievement in Musical/Variety.

Weekly charts

Year-end charts

Certifications

References

External links
Jerry Seinfeld: 'I'm Telling You for the Last Time' at the Internet Movie Database

Jerry Seinfeld albums
HBO network specials
1990s American television specials
1990s in comedy
Comedy albums by American artists
Stand-up comedy albums
Spoken word albums by American artists
Live albums by American artists
Live comedy albums
1990s comedy albums
1998 debut albums
1998 live albums
1999 video albums
Stand-up comedy concert films
1998 in New York City
Universal Records live albums
Stand-up comedy on DVD
1990s English-language films